The second season of the Mexican television series Rosario Tijeras, created by Adriana Pelusi and Carlos Quintanilla. The season premiered on 27 August 2018 and concluded on 16 December 2018. This season aired on Azteca 7, unlike the previous season which aired on Azteca 13. The season was announced in January 2017. Production of the season began in October 2017. 60 episodes have been confirmed for the season. In the United States the season premiered on UniMás on 7 January 2019.

Bárbara de Regil and José María de Tavira returned from the previous season. New actors joining the series include Christian Chávez and Sebastián Martínez.

Plot 
After escaping death, Rosario and Antonio manage to outwit their enemies to ensure their freedom, but are forced to separate while fleeing. Rosario falls into the grasp of El Ángel, a mysterious man who is both seductive and violent, and hides a very dark secret. Rosario will find herself in the middle of a bloody revenge between two crime bosses, and she will have to do everything possible to save her little brother and recover Antonio, the love of her life.

Cast 
 Bárbara de Regil as Rosario Tijeras 
 José María de Tavira as Antonio Bethancourt
 Sebastián Martínez as Daniel Salgado "El Ángel"
 Hernán Mendoza as León Elías Arteaga
 Danny Perea as Pamela Pulido
 Verónica Langer as Aurora
 Harold Azuara as Erik
 Christian Chávez as Guarro
 Claudio Lafarga as Gabriel
 Sonia Couoh as Melva
 Mario Loría as Jonás
 Gabriel Casanova as Isaac Medina
 Lucía Silva as Paula Restrepo
 Israel Islas as Toxina
 Leonardo Alonso as Génaro
 Ignacio Riva Palacio as Andrómeda
 Palmeira Cruz as Venus
 Tatiana Martínez as Serena
 Lizzy Auna as Alexandra
 Marina Victoria as Tania
 Alan Castillo as John
 Fernando Ciangherotti as Pegaso
 Yolanda Ventura as Andrea

Recurring and guest 
 Constantino Morán as Querubín
 Juan José Pucheta as Manuel Osorno
 Pamela Almanza as Laura Peralta

Episodes

References 

2018 Mexican television seasons